Borough Cemetery is a cemetery in Powder Mill Lane, Heathfield in the London Borough of Richmond upon Thames, though owned and operated by neighbouring  Hounslow Council. It was established in 1942 in what was then the Municipal Borough of Heston and Isleworth and was originally called Heston and Isleworth Cemetery.

A 2011 audit of London Burial Provision reported that Borough Cemetery had 8.9 ha of reserved burial land.  However, more recent documents indicate that it has 1.2 ha of reserved burial land.

References

External links
 

1942 establishments in England
Cemeteries in the London Borough of Richmond upon Thames
Whitton, London
Parks and open spaces in the London Borough of Hounslow